This is a list of newspapers in Florida.

Daily and weekly newspapers (currently published)

Student newspapers
 The Avion Newspaper (Embry-Riddle Aeronautical University)
 The Beacon (Florida International University)
 Central Florida Future (University of Central Florida)
 The Corsair (Pensacola State College)
 The Famuan (Florida A&M University)
 The Reporter  (Miami Dade College)
 FSView & Florida Flambeau (Florida State University) 
 The Galleon 
 The Independent Florida Alligator (University of Florida)
 The Miami Hurricane (University of Miami in Coral Gables)
 The Oracle (University of South Florida)
 The Spinnaker (University of North Florida)
 The University Press (Florida Atlantic University)
 The Valencia Voice (Valencia College) 
 The Voyager (University of West Florida)
 The Catalyst (New College of Florida)

Defunct

See also
 Florida media
 List of radio stations in Florida
 List of television stations in Florida
 Media of cities in Florida: Fort Lauderdale, Gainesville, Jacksonville, Key West, Lakeland, Miami, Orlando, St. Petersburg, Tallahassee, Tampa, Windermere
 List of French-language newspapers published in the United States (includes some Florida titles)
 List of Spanish-language newspapers published in the United States (includes some Florida titles)
 Journalism:
 :Category:Journalists from Florida
 Journalism schools:
 Florida A&M University School of Journalism & Graphic Communication (est. 1982), in Tallahassee
 Florida International University School of Journalism and Mass Communication, in North Miami 
 University of Florida College of Journalism and Communications in Gainesville
 University of Miami School of Communication 
 Florida literature

References

Bibliography
  
 
 
 
  
 Chapter about Newspapers
 Chronological List of Florida Newspapers Published before July 1845
 
 
 
 
 

External links

 
 
 . (Survey of local news existence and ownership in 21st century)
 
 
  (Directory ceased in 2017)
  
  (Includes Florida newspapers) 
 
 
 
 
 
Florida and Puerto Rico Digital Newspaper Project
Chronicling America
Florida Digital Newspaper Library